Caught is a 2015 American made-for-television psychological thriller film directed by Maggie Kiley and starring Anna Camp, Samuel Page, Stefanie Scott and Amelia Rose Blaire.

Plot
Allie (Stefanie Scott) has a secret relationship with Justin (Samuel Page), who is an older but charming guy. What she does not know is that he is married to Sabrina (Anna Camp) who, upon discovering the affair enlists her reluctant sister Paige (Amelia Rose Blaire) to help kidnap Allie. Intended as a prank, the situation goes out of control as Allie fights for her life.

Cast
Anna Camp as Sabrina
Samuel Page as Justin
Stefanie Scott as Allie
Mary B. McCann as Beth
Amelia Rose Blaire as Paige
Wolfgang Bodison as Coach

Filming
The film took place in North Carolina, Los Angeles, and Boston.

References

External links

2015 television films
2015 films
2015 psychological thriller films